Zápas s nebem is a Czech science fiction novel, written by J. M. Troska. It was first published in 1941.

20th-century Czech novels
1941 science fiction novels
Czech science fiction novels